In six-dimensional geometry, a stericated 6-simplex is a convex uniform 6-polytope with 4th order truncations (sterication) of the regular 6-simplex.

There are 8 unique sterications for the 6-simplex with permutations of truncations, cantellations, and runcinations.

Stericated 6-simplex

Alternate names 
 Small cellated heptapeton (Acronym: scal) (Jonathan Bowers)

Coordinates 

The vertices of the stericated 6-simplex can be most simply positioned in 7-space as permutations of (0,0,1,1,1,1,2). This construction is based on facets of the stericated 7-orthoplex.

Images

Steritruncated 6-simplex

Alternate names 
 Cellitruncated heptapeton (Acronym: catal) (Jonathan Bowers)

Coordinates 
The vertices of the steritruncated 6-simplex can be most simply positioned in 7-space as permutations of (0,0,1,1,1,2,3). This construction is based on facets of the steritruncated 7-orthoplex.

Images

Stericantellated 6-simplex

Alternate names 
 Cellirhombated heptapeton (Acronym: cral) (Jonathan Bowers)

Coordinates 
The vertices of the stericantellated 6-simplex can be most simply positioned in 7-space as permutations of (0,0,1,1,2,2,3). This construction is based on facets of the stericantellated 7-orthoplex.

Images

Stericantitruncated 6-simplex

Alternate names 
 Celligreatorhombated heptapeton (Acronym: cagral) (Jonathan Bowers)

Coordinates 
The vertices of the stericanttruncated 6-simplex can be most simply positioned in 7-space as permutations of (0,0,0,1,2,3,4). This construction is based on facets of the stericantitruncated 7-orthoplex.

Images

Steriruncinated 6-simplex

Alternate names 
 Celliprismated heptapeton (Acronym: copal) (Jonathan Bowers)

Coordinates 
The vertices of the steriruncinated 6-simplex can be most simply positioned in 7-space as permutations of (0,0,1,2,2,3,3). This construction is based on facets of the steriruncinated 7-orthoplex.

Images

Steriruncitruncated 6-simplex

Alternate names 
 Celliprismatotruncated heptapeton (Acronym: captal) (Jonathan Bowers)

Coordinates 
The vertices of the steriruncittruncated 6-simplex can be most simply positioned in 7-space as permutations of (0,0,0,1,2,3,4). This construction is based on facets of the steriruncitruncated 7-orthoplex.

Images

Steriruncicantellated 6-simplex

Alternate names 
 Bistericantitruncated 6-simplex as t1,2,3,5{3,3,3,3,3}
 Celliprismatorhombated heptapeton (Acronym: copril) (Jonathan Bowers)

Coordinates 
The vertices of the steriruncitcantellated 6-simplex can be most simply positioned in 7-space as permutations of (0,0,0,1,2,3,4). This construction is based on facets of the steriruncicantellated 7-orthoplex.

Images

Steriruncicantitruncated 6-simplex

Alternate names 
 Great cellated heptapeton (Acronym: gacal) (Jonathan Bowers)

Coordinates 
The vertices of the steriruncicantittruncated 6-simplex can be most simply positioned in 7-space as permutations of (0,0,1,2,3,4,5). This construction is based on facets of the steriruncicantitruncated 7-orthoplex.

Images

Related uniform 6-polytopes 
The truncated 6-simplex is one of 35 uniform 6-polytopes based on the [3,3,3,3,3] Coxeter group, all shown here in A6 Coxeter plane orthographic projections.

Notes

References
 H.S.M. Coxeter: 
 H.S.M. Coxeter, Regular Polytopes, 3rd Edition, Dover New York, 1973 
 Kaleidoscopes: Selected Writings of H.S.M. Coxeter, edited by F. Arthur Sherk, Peter McMullen, Anthony C. Thompson, Asia Ivic Weiss, Wiley-Interscience Publication, 1995,  
 (Paper 22) H.S.M. Coxeter, Regular and Semi Regular Polytopes I, [Math. Zeit. 46 (1940) 380-407, MR 2,10]
 (Paper 23) H.S.M. Coxeter, Regular and Semi-Regular Polytopes II, [Math. Zeit. 188 (1985) 559-591]
 (Paper 24) H.S.M. Coxeter, Regular and Semi-Regular Polytopes III, [Math. Zeit. 200 (1988) 3-45]
 Norman Johnson Uniform Polytopes, Manuscript (1991)
 N.W. Johnson: The Theory of Uniform Polytopes and Honeycombs, Ph.D.

External links 
 Polytopes of Various Dimensions
 Multi-dimensional Glossary

6-polytopes